Boveney is a village in Buckinghamshire, England, near Windsor. It is situated between the villages of Eton Wick in Berkshire, and Dorney and Dorney Reach in Buckinghamshire. Since boundary changes in 1974 and 1995, Boveney is the southernmost village in Buckinghamshire.

The village name is Anglo-Saxon in origin and means "above island". This refers to the island in the River Thames next to the village. The Anglo-Saxon name for the village was Bufanege.

Boveney was once a hamlet within the parish of Burnham, though it has long since been considered a separate village, particularly since the urban growth of nearby Slough. It became a separate civil parish in 1866, having been a chapelry before, and was part of Eton Rural District from 1894 to 1934. In 1934 the parish of Boveney was abolished, under a County Review Order, with the more urbanised part being added to Eton Urban District, and a larger, less populous part being added to the parish of Dorney.

The Church of St Mary Magdalene is in a remote part of the village by the River Thames. This church was used as a location for many Hammer Horror movies which were made at nearby Bray Studios. In 1983 the church was declared redundant and vested in the care of the Friends of Friendless Churches, who repair and conserve it for visitors and local people to enjoy. In 2004 a major campaign was undertaken to repair the 14th century timber-framed tower and a further programme of repairs was planned for 2007, so the church was closed to visitors.

Many TV and film companies use the village as a location. Inspector Morse episode Silent World of Nicholas Quinn and the Kevin Costner movie Robin Hood: Prince of Thieves were partly filmed here. The signpost for the village appeared very briefly in the 1976 Sweeney episode "I Want the Man" as a white Mercedes Benz limousine turns left towards the village (06m 48secs standard Freemantle DVD).

Dorney Common, which borders the village, is one of several locations to view Windsor Castle from outside the town of Windsor itself; the large open space affords panoramic views of the castle as well as parts of Eton.

References

Parish History of Boveney

External links 

Friends of Friendless Churches
US site with Church Pictures

Villages in Buckinghamshire
Former civil parishes in Buckinghamshire